Nelly Artin Kalfayan (born 3 January 1949 in Cairo, Egypt), better known by only her mononym Nelly, is an Egyptian actress, singer, comedian, dancer, television personality, and all-around entertainer.

Family background
Nelly was born and 1949 to an Egyptian family of Armenian roots. The school she attended as a child was run by and for people of Armenian descent in Cairo. She is the younger sister of Feyrouz, a well-known child actress, and a cousin of Lubluba, another well-known Egyptian-Armenian film actress who is a little older than she is. Nelly was married to the Egyptian film director Houssam El-Din Mustafa, and later on she married musician Moody Elemam for a very short time. She later married Khaled Barakat (Egyptian businessman) and moved to London, then later divorced and married Adel Hossny, another Egyptian businessman working in the Tourism industry.

Career
Her father was a film director. and she started her career as a child actress, following the footsteps of her older sister, Feyrouz, who was a very famous child actress before her. She appeared in a dozen movies as a child, and also took part in radio serials, and in theatrical works. Her fame grew larger in 1966, at age 17, with the first film in which she had the lead role, Mahmoud Zulfikar’s "Al Murahiqa as Saghira". One of her most critically acclaimed roles was the secondary role she played in "Al Azab Imra'a".

She has more than 60 films to her credit. The majority of these are musicals, or films with a thread of plot and drama that is punctuated intermittently with song and dance. Most of them have a comic spirit. Nelly acted in seven films alongside Salah Zulfikar, also acted in a number of straight melodrama TV series, most notably "Bardis" and "Ad Dawwama".

Fawazir Nelly
Of her large amount of artistic work, Nelly is best known throughout the Arab World for her "Fawazir Ramadan" (فوازير رمضان) (translates as Ramadan puzzles), a set of TV comedy shows with much music and dancing, with Nelly the star of the shows. The hugely followed shows were broadcast to tens of major Arab television stations throughout the Arab World on a daily basis during the holy month of Ramadan, mixed with general entertainment segments. Each year's "fawazir" series was held together around a different organizing theme. The shows included: Fawazir Arusty (1980), Fawazir Al Khatbah (1981), Fawazir Alam Wareq (1990), Fawazir Sanduq El Dunya (1991), Fawazir Om El Oreaf (1992), Fawazir Dunya Laaba (1995), Fawazir Zay El Naharda (1996). Nelly's last fawazir was in 1996, but she did a show in the fawazir style called Alf Leila Wa Leila in 2001. Since then, Nelly has turned down a number of proposals to do another fawazir by reason of "a lack of fresh ideas".

Recent years
Nelly has largely retired from making films, comedy shows, and music, but she has been visible as a guest personality on a number of TV talk & entertainment programs. She also served as a judge in 2006 in The X Factor, XSeer Al Najah TV singing talent search show. In January 2010 it was reported that Nelly accepted an actress role in a proposed serious TV drama. If this proposal goes to completion, it will be Nelly's first serious drama role since 1989.

Filmography 
 (2002) ألو رابع مرة TV series
 (2000) ألف ليلة وليلة TV series
 (1997) سنوات الشقاء والحب TV series
 Mekanika (TV Movie) (Nancy / Rich spoiled heiress) (1993)
 Ana Wenty Wa Sa’at Alsafar  (1985)
 Pardes (1985) TV series  برديس
 قط الصحراء
 The Ghoul (Moshira) (1983)
 حبيبي الذي لا أعرفه
 مسرحية إنقلاب
 غابة من الرجال
 الخاتم
 إنها مجنونة مجنونة
 اتنين على الهوا
 حادث النصف متر
 مع تحياتي لأستاذي العزيز
 دندش
 A Moment of Weakness
 اللعبة القذرة
 العاشقة
 Unconditionally Female (1980)
 Sin of an Angel (خطيئة ملاك) (1979)
 Al eeteraf al akhir (1978)
 Al-azab emra aa (Inass) (1977)
 الوهم
 خطيئة ملاك
 شفاه لا تعرف الكذب
 عيب يا لولو .. يا لولو عيب
 النشالة
 إمرأة بلا قيد
 الإعتراف الأخير
 مبروك جالك ولد
 أهلا يا كابتن
 طائر الليل الحزين
 العذاب امرأة
 عذراء.. ولكن
 البنت الحلوة الكدابة
 الدموع في عيون ضاحكة
 وداعًا للأمس
 شلة الأنس
 العاشقات
 الحساب يا مدموزيل
 صائد النساء
 نساء ضائعات
 إمرأتان
 الخاطئون
 سيدتي الجميلة
 سؤال في الحب
 عايشين للحب
 غابة من السيقان
 قاع المدينة
 نساء للشتاء
 دنيا
 مسرحية سندريلا والمداح
 بنات للحب
 مسرحية كباريه
 الشحات
 كلمة شرف
 نساء الليل
 مدينة الصمت
 Memory of a Night of Love
 الدوامة TV series
 الحب والصمت
 المارد TV series
 شياطين البحر
 ملوك الشر
 مسرحية العيال الطيبين
 شباب في عاصفة
 عصابة الشيطان
 مذكرات الآنسة منال
 غداً يعود الحب
 لا لا يا حبيبي
My Husband’s Wife
 مغامرة شباب
 Medinet al-Samt (1973) 
 Good Morning, My Dear Wife
 يوم واحد عسل
 مجرم تحت الاختبار
 دلع البنات
 زوجة بلا رجل
 الحب سنة 70
 أسرار البنات
 مسرحية الدلوعة
 الرجل الذي فقد ظله
 نساء بلا غد
 اللص الظريف
 طائر الليل الحزين
 مذكرات الآنسة منال
 Ana al-Doctor (Nadia) (1968)
 El ragol el-lazi fakad zilloh (Samia Samy) (1968)
 Mogrem that el-ekhtebar (Aziza) (1968)
 Aguazet seif (Hala) (1967)
 Beit el talibat (Amal) (1967)
 Nora (Nora) (1967)
 The Teddy Boys (المشاغبون) (1966)
 المراهقة الصغيرة  (1966)
 (1959) الرمال الناعمة
 (1958) هي والرجال
 التوبة  (1958)
 رحمة من السماء  (1958)
 حتى نلتقي  (1957)
 Birds of Paradise (عصافير الجنة) (1956)
 عصافير الجنة  (1955)
 الحرمان (1953)

Awards
Best secondary role in "Al Azab Imra'a" (العذاب إمرأة)
Lifetime achievement award during the Alexandria International Film Festival in 1999
Murex Excellence Awards in Lebanon 2008.

References

1949 births
Living people
Actresses from Cairo
Entertainers from Cairo
Egyptian Christians
Egyptian people of Armenian descent
Egyptian film actresses
Egyptian television actresses
Egyptian female dancers
Egyptian comedians